Aloisio or Aloísio is a Romance masculine given name, arising via an Old Occitan form  Aloys from Louis.

 Aloisio da Milano, also known as Aloisio da Carezano, Aleviz Milanets and Aleviz Fryazin, 15th/16th century Italian architect
 Aloisio the New, 16th century Italian Renaissance architect
 Aloísio Pires Alves (born 1963), Brazilian footballer (defender)
 Aloísio da Silva Filho (born 1974), Brazilian footballer (goalkeeper)
 Aloísio José da Silva (born 1975), Brazilian footballer (striker)
 Aloísio dos Santos Gonçalves (born 1988), Brazilian footballer (striker)